Howard Bruce Bluestein is a research meteorologist known for his mesoscale meteorology, severe weather, and radar research. He is a major participant in the VORTEX projects. A native of the Boston area, Dr. Bluestein received his Ph.D. in 1976 from MIT. He has been a professor of meteorology at the University of Oklahoma (OU) since 1976.

Background
Bluestein's masters thesis was Prediction of Satellite Cloud Patterns Using Spatial Fourier Transforms and his doctoral dissertation was Synoptic-scale Deformation and Tropical Cloud Bands. He is the George Lynn Cross Research Professor at the OU School of Meteorology. He was on the steering committee and was a principal investigator (PI) for VORTEX2, the field phase of which occurred from 2009-2010. Bluestein is a Fellow of the American Meteorological Society (AMS), served on the National Research Council (NRC) Board of Atmospheric Sciences and Climate (BASC) and on the NRC Committee on Weather Radar Technology Beyond NEXRAD.

Bluestein authored Synoptic-Dynamic Meteorology in Midlatitudes: Vol. 1: Principles of Kinematics and Dynamics in 1992, Synoptic-Dynamic Meteorology in Midlatitudes: Volume II: Observations and Theory of Weather Systems in 1993, and Severe Convective Storms and Tornadoes: Observations and Dynamics in  2013. He co-edited, with Lance Bosart, Synoptic-Dynamic Meteorology and Weather Analysis and Forecasting: A Tribute to Fred Sanders in 2008. He wrote the popular book Tornado Alley: Monster Storms of the Great Plains in 1999. Howie "Cb" Bluestein, a nickname that is the abbreviation for cumulonimbus, has been a contributor to Storm Track and Weatherwise magazines.

Bluestein is noted for his co-invention of the tornado-measuring device TOTO, with Al Bedard and Carl Ramzy of NOAA,

See also
 Joshua Wurman

Notes

External links
 OU faculty listing
 
 Stormchasers: A Day in the Life of a Storm Chaser (WGBH)
  Storm chaser: Tornado expert Howard Bluestein says that cows don't fly, but cars do (Salon.com)

Living people
American meteorologists
Massachusetts Institute of Technology alumni
University of Oklahoma faculty
Year of birth missing (living people)
Place of birth missing (living people)
Storm chasers
Fellows of the American Meteorological Society